Kama (in Estonian) or talkkuna (in Finnish) or tolokno (in Russian: толокно), talqan (in Turkic languages) is a traditional Estonian, Finnish, Russian, Turkic finely milled flour mixture. The kama or talkkuna powder is a mixture of roasted barley, rye, oat and pea flour. The oat flour may be completely replaced by wheat flour, or kibbled black beans may be added to the mixture. In Finland talkkuna is made by first steaming grains, then grinding them up and finally roasting them into talkkuna.

"Historically kama was a non-perishable, easy-to-carry food that could be quickly fashioned into a stomach-filling snack by rolling it into butter or lard; it did not require baking, as it was already roasted".

Nowadays it is used for making some desserts. It is mostly enjoyed for breakfast mixed with milk, buttermilk or kefir as mush. It is frequently sweetened with sugar and especially with blueberry, more rarely with other fruits or honey or served unsweetened. It is also used for milk or sour desserts, together with the forest berries typical in Estonia and Finland.

Kama can be bought as a souvenir in Estonia, where it is a distinctive national food.

A similar product is skrädmjöl, a flour consisting exclusively of roasted oats which is traditionally made in the Swedish province of Värmland. It was brought there by Forest Finns.

In Turkic languages, it is called talqan. It is made of coarse or finely milled flour from roasted barley or wheat. It is common in the cuisine of Altay people, Nogays, Bashkirs, Kazakhs, Tatars, Tuvans, Uzbeks, Khakas.

See also 
 Gofio
 Misutgaru
 Rubaboo
 Tsampa

References

Estonian cuisine
Finnish cuisine
Flour
National dishes